Pladda is an uninhabited island  off the south coast of the Isle of Arran in the Firth of Clyde at , western Scotland. It is home to the automated Pladda Lighthouse. The island is privately owned, having been put up for sale by Arran Estate in 1990. As of 2022, the island is again for sale.

Geography 
Unusually for such a small island, it has its own source of fresh water. Pladda shares its name with Pladda Island, a tiny islet situated in the Lynn of Lorne between Lismore and Ardmucknish Bay.

Lighthouse 
Pladda Lighthouse and its ancillary buildings stand at the southern end of Pladda.

Church 
There appears to have been a church or chapel on Pladda. John of Fordun and other chroniclers from 1400 to 1500 speak of the isle of St Blase of Pladda. Nothing now remains to mark its site, and its whereabouts are unknown.

In popular culture
Pladda and its lighthouse feature extensively in Peter Hill's book Stargazing: Memoirs of a Young Lighthouse Keeper. They were also filming locations for "Queen Victoria Syndrome", the first episode of season 5 of The Crown.

References

External links

Northern Lighthouse Board site on the history of Pladda Lighthouse

Islands of the Clyde
Uninhabited islands of North Ayrshire
Firth of Clyde